The Caribbean Sea is a sea of the Atlantic Ocean in the tropics of the Western Hemisphere. It is bounded by Mexico and Central America to the west and southwest, to the north by the Greater Antilles starting with Cuba, to the east by the Lesser Antilles, and to the south by the northern coast of South America. The Gulf of Mexico lies to the northwest.

The entire area of the Caribbean Sea, the numerous islands of the West Indies, and adjacent coasts are collectively known as the Caribbean. The Caribbean coastline has many gulfs and bays: the Gulf of Gonâve, Gulf of Venezuela, Gulf of Darién, Golfo de los Mosquitos, Gulf of Paria and Gulf of Honduras.

The Caribbean Sea has the world's second largest barrier reef, the Mesoamerican Barrier Reef. It runs  along the coasts of Mexico, Belize, Guatemala, and Honduras.

History

The name Caribbean derives from the Caribs, one of the region's dominant Native American groups at the time of European contact during the late 15th century. After Christopher Columbus landed in the Bahamas in 1492, the Spanish term Antillas applied to the lands; stemming from this, Sea of the Antilles became a common alternative name for "Caribbean Sea" in various European languages. During the first century of European colonization, Spanish dominance in the region remained undisputed.

From the 16th century, Europeans visiting the Caribbean region distinguished the "South Sea" (the Pacific Ocean south of the isthmus of Panama) from the "North Sea" (the Caribbean Sea north of the same isthmus).

The Caribbean Sea had been unknown to the populations of Eurasia until 1492, when Christopher Columbus sailed into Caribbean waters on a quest to find a sea route to Asia. At that time the Americas in general were unknown to most Europeans, although they had been visited in the 10th century by the Vikings. Following the discovery of the islands by Columbus, the area was quickly colonized by several Western cultures (initially Spain, then later England, the Dutch Republic, France, Courland and Denmark). Following the colonization of the Caribbean islands, the Caribbean Sea became a busy area for European-based marine trading and transports, and this commerce eventually attracted pirates such as Samuel Bellamy and Blackbeard.

 the area is home to 22 island territories and borders 12 continental countries.

Extent
The International Hydrographic Organization defines the limits of the Caribbean Sea as follows:

On the North. In the Windward Channel – a line joining Caleta Point (74°15′W) and Pearl Point (19°40′N) in Haiti. In the Mona Passage – a line joining Cape Engaño and the extreme of Agujereada in Puerto Rico.

Eastern limits. From Point San Diego (Puerto Rico) Northward along the meridian thereof (65°39′W) to the 100-fathom line, thence Eastward and Southward, in such a manner that all islands, shoals and narrow waters of the Lesser Antilles are included in the Caribbean Sea as far as Galera Point (Northeast extremity of the island of Trinidad). From Galera Point through Trinidad to Galeota Point (Southeast extreme) and thence to Baja Point in Venezuela.

Note that, although Barbados is an island on the same continental shelf, it is considered to be in the Atlantic Ocean rather than the Caribbean Sea.

Geology
The Caribbean Sea is an oceanic sea largely situated on the Caribbean Plate. The Caribbean Sea is separated from the ocean by several island arcs of various ages. The youngest stretches from the Lesser Antilles to the Virgin Islands to the north east of Trinidad and Tobago off the coast of Venezuela. This arc was formed by the collision of the South American Plate with the Caribbean Plate and includes active and extinct volcanoes such as Mount Pelee, the Quill (volcano) on Sint Eustatius in the Caribbean Netherlands and Morne Trois Pitons on Dominica. The larger islands in the northern part of the sea Cuba, Hispaniola, Jamaica and Puerto Rico lie on an older island arc.

The geological age of the Caribbean Sea is estimated to be between 160 and 180 million years and was formed by a horizontal fracture that split the supercontinent called Pangea in the Mesozoic Era. It is assumed the proto-caribbean basin existed in the Devonian period. In the early Carboniferous movement of Gondwana to the north and its convergence with the Euramerica basin decreased in size. The next stage of the Caribbean Sea's formation began in the Triassic. Powerful rifting led to the formation of narrow troughs, stretching from modern Newfoundland to the west coast of the Gulf of Mexico which formed siliciclastic sedimentary rocks. In the early Jurassic due to powerful marine transgression, water broke into the present area of the Gulf of Mexico creating a vast shallow pool. The emergence of deep basins in the Caribbean occurred during the Middle Jurassic rifting. The emergence of these basins marked the beginning of the Atlantic Ocean and contributed to the destruction of Pangaea at the end of the late Jurassic. During the Cretaceous the Caribbean acquired the shape close to that seen today. In the early Paleogene due to marine regression the Caribbean became separated from the Gulf of Mexico and the Atlantic Ocean by the land of Cuba and Haiti. The Caribbean remained like this for most of the Cenozoic until the Holocene when rising water levels of the oceans restored communication with the Atlantic Ocean.

The Caribbean's floor is composed of sub-oceanic sediments of deep red clay in the deep basins and troughs. On continental slopes and ridges calcareous silts are found. Clay minerals likely having been deposited by the mainland river Orinoco and the Magdalena River. Upper sedimentary layers relate to the period from the Mesozoic to the Cenozoic (250 million years ago to present) and the lower layers from the Paleozoic to the Mesozoic.

The Caribbean sea floor is divided into five basins separated from each other by underwater ridges and mountain ranges. Atlantic Ocean water enters the Caribbean through the Anegada Passage lying between the Lesser Antilles and Virgin Islands and the Windward Passage located between Cuba and Haiti. The Yucatán Channel between Mexico and Cuba links the Gulf of Mexico with the Caribbean. Despite this, the Caribbean Sea is considered a relatively shallow sea in comparison to other bodies of water.
The pressure of the South American Plate to the east of the Caribbean causes the region of the Lesser Antilles to have high volcanic activity. There was a very serious eruption of Mount Pelée in 1902 which caused many casualties.

The Caribbean sea floor is also home to two oceanic trenches: the Cayman Trench and Puerto Rico Trench, which put the area at a high risk of earthquakes. Underwater earthquakes pose a threat of generating tsunamis which could have a devastating effect on the Caribbean islands. Scientific data reveals that over the last 500 years the area has seen a dozen earthquakes above 7.5 magnitude. Most recently, a 7.1 earthquake struck Haiti on January 12, 2010.
 List of islands in the Caribbean

Oceanography

The hydrology of the sea has a high level of homogeneity. Annual variations in monthly average water temperatures at the surface do not exceed . Virtually all temperature extremes were associated with the phenomena of El Niño and La Niña. The surface water colour is blue-green to green.

The Caribbean's depth in its wider basins and deep-water temperatures are similar to those of the Atlantic. Atlantic deep water is thought to spill into the Caribbean and contribute to the general deep water of its sea. The surface water (30 m; 100 ft) acts as an extension of the northern Atlantic as the Guiana Current and part of the North Equatorial Current enter the sea on the east. On the western side of the sea, the trade winds influence a northerly current which causes an upwelling and a rich fishery near Yucatán.

Ecology
It runs along the Caribbean coasts of Mexico, Belize, Guatemala and Honduras.

Since 2005 unusually warm Caribbean waters have been increasingly threatening Caribbean coral reefs. Coral reefs support some of the most diverse marine habitats in the world, but they are fragile ecosystems. When tropical waters become unusually warm for extended periods of time, microscopic plants called zooxanthellae, which are symbiotic partners living within the coral polyp tissues, die off. These plants provide food for the corals and give them their color. The result of the death and dispersal of these tiny plants is called coral bleaching, and can lead to the devastation of large areas of reef. Over 42% of corals are completely bleached, and 95% are experiencing some type of whitening. Historically the Caribbean is thought to contain 14% of the world's coral reefs.

The habitats supported by the reefs are critical to such tourist activities as fishing and diving, and provide an annual economic value to Caribbean nations of US$3.1–4.6 billion. Continued destruction of the reefs could severely damage the region's economy. A Protocol of the Convention for the Protection and Development of the Marine Environment of the Wider Caribbean Region came in effect in 1986 to protect the various endangered marine life of the Caribbean through forbidding human activities that would advance the continued destruction of such marine life in various areas. Currently this protocol has been ratified by 15 countries. Also, several charitable organisations have been formed to preserve the Caribbean marine life, such as Caribbean Conservation Corporation which seeks to study and protect sea turtles while educating others about them.

In connection with the foregoing, the Institute of Marine Sciences and Limnology of the National Autonomous University of Mexico, conducted a regional study, funded by the Department of Technical Cooperation of the International Atomic Energy Agency, in which specialists from 11 Latin American countries (Colombia, Costa Rica, Cuba, Guatemala, Haiti, Honduras, Mexico, Nicaragua, Panama, Dominican Republic, Venezuela) plus Jamaica participated. The findings indicate that heavy metals such as mercury, arsenic, and lead, have been identified in the coastal zone of the Caribbean Sea. Analysis of toxic metals and hydrocarbons is based on the investigation of coastal sediments that have accumulated less than 50 meters deep during the last hundred and fifty years. The project results were presented in Vienna in the forum "Water Matters", and the 2011 General Conference of said multilateral organization.

After the Mediterranean, the Caribbean Sea is the second most polluted sea. Pollution (in the form of up to 300,000 tonnes of solid garbage dumped into the Caribbean Sea each year) is progressively endangering marine ecosystems, wiping out species, and harming the livelihoods of the local people, which is primarily reliant on tourism and fishing.

KfW took part in a €25.7 million funding agreement to eliminate marine trash and boost the circular economy in the Caribbean's Small Island Developing States. The project "Sustainable finance methods for marine preservation in the Caribbean" will assist remove solid waste and keep it out of the marine and coastal environment by establishing a new facility under the Caribbean Biodiversity Fund (CBF). Non-governmental organizations, universities, public institutions, civil society organizations, and the corporate sector are all eligible for financing. The project is estimated to prevent and remove at least 15 000 tonnes of marine trash, benefiting at least 20 000 individuals.

Climate

The climate of the Caribbean is driven by the low latitude and tropical ocean currents that run through it. The principal ocean current is the North Equatorial Current, which enters the region from the tropical Atlantic. The climate of the area is tropical, varying from tropical rainforest in some areas to tropical savanna in others. There are also some locations that are arid climates with considerable drought in some years.

Rainfall varies with elevation, size, and water currents (cool upwelling keep the ABC islands arid). Warm, moist trade winds blow consistently from the east, creating both rainforest and semi-arid climates across the region. The tropical rainforest climates include lowland areas near the Caribbean Sea from Costa Rica north to Belize, as well as the Dominican Republic and Puerto Rico, while the more seasonal dry tropical savanna climates are found in Cuba, northern Venezuela, and southern Yucatán, Mexico. Arid climates are found along the extreme southern coast of Venezuela out to the islands including Aruba and Curaçao, as well as the northern tip of Yucatán

Tropical cyclones are a threat to the nations that rim the Caribbean Sea. While landfalls are infrequent, the resulting loss of life and property damage makes them a significant hazard to life in the Caribbean. Tropical cyclones that impact the Caribbean often develop off the West coast of Africa and make their way west across the Atlantic Ocean toward the Caribbean, while other storms develop in the Caribbean itself. The Caribbean hurricane season as a whole lasts from June through November, with the majority of hurricanes occurring during August and September. On average around nine tropical storms form each year, with five reaching hurricane strength. According to the National Hurricane Center 385 hurricanes occurred in the Caribbean between 1494 and 1900.

Flora and fauna
The region has a high level of biodiversity and many species are endemic to the Caribbean.

Vegetation
The vegetation of the region is mostly tropical but differences in topography, soil and climatic conditions increase species diversity. Where there are porous limestone terraced islands these are generally poor in nutrients. It is estimated that 13,000 species of plants grow in the Caribbean of which 6,500 are endemic. For example, guaiac wood (Guaiacum officinale), the flower of which is the national flower of Jamaica and the Bayahibe rose (Pereskia quisqueyana) which is the national flower of the Dominican Republic and the ceiba which is the national tree of both Puerto Rico and Guatemala. The mahogany is the national tree of the Dominican Republic and Belize. The caimito (Chrysophyllum cainito) grows throughout the Caribbean. In coastal zones there are coconut palms and in lagoons and estuaries are found thick areas of black mangrove and red mangrove (Rhizophora mangle).

In shallow water flora and fauna is concentrated around coral reefs where there is little variation in water temperature, purity and salinity. Leeward side of lagoons provide areas of growth for sea grasses. In brackish water of harbours and estuaries at depths less than  widgeongrass (Ruppia maritima) grows. Representatives of three species belonging to the genus Halophila, (Halophila baillonii, Halophila engelmannii and Halophila decipiens) are found at depths of up to  except for Halophila engelmani which does not grow below  and is confined to the Bahamas, Florida, the Greater Antilles and the western part of the Caribbean. Halophila baillonii has been found only in the Lesser Antilles.

Fauna

Marine biota in the region have representatives of both the Indian and Pacific oceans which were caught in the Caribbean before the emergence of the Isthmus of Panama four million years ago. In the Caribbean Sea there are around 1,000 documented species of fish, including sharks (bull shark, tiger shark, silky shark and Caribbean reef shark), flying fish, giant oceanic manta ray, angel fish, spotfin butterflyfish, parrotfish, Atlantic Goliath grouper, tarpon and moray eels. Throughout the Caribbean there is industrial catching of lobster and sardines (off the coast of Yucatán Peninsula).

There are 90 species of mammals in the Caribbean including sperm whales, humpback whales and dolphins. The island of Jamaica is home to seals and manatees. The Caribbean monk seal which lived in the Caribbean is considered extinct. Solenodons and hutias are mammals found only in the Caribbean; only one extant species is not endangered.

There are 500 species of reptiles (94% of which are endemic). Islands are inhabited by some endemic species such as rock iguanas and American crocodile. The blue iguana, endemic to the island of Grand Cayman, is endangered. The green iguana is invasive to Grand Cayman. The Mona ground iguana which inhabits the island of Mona, Puerto Rico, is endangered. The rhinoceros iguana from the island of Hispaniola which is shared between Haiti and the Dominican Republic is also endangered. The region has several types of sea turtle (loggerhead, green turtle, hawksbill, leatherback turtle, Atlantic ridley and olive ridley). Some species are threatened with extinction. Their populations have been greatly reduced since the 17th century – the number of green turtles has declined from 91 million to 300,000 and hawksbill turtles from 11 million to less than 30,000 by 2006.

All 170 species of amphibians that live in the region are endemic. The habitats of almost all members of the toad family, poison dart frogs, tree frogs and leptodactylidae (a type of frog) are limited to only one island. The Golden coqui is in serious threat of extinction.

In the Caribbean, 600 species of birds have been recorded, of which 163 are endemic such as todies, Fernandina's flicker and palmchat. The American yellow warbler is found in many areas, as is the green heron. Of the endemic species 48 are threatened with extinction including the Puerto Rican amazon, and the Zapata wren. According to Birdlife International in 2006 in Cuba 29 species of bird are in danger of extinction and two species officially extinct. The black-fronted piping guan is endangered. The Antilles along with Central America lie in the flight path of migrating birds from North America so the size of populations is subject to seasonal fluctuations. Parrots and bananaquits are found in forests. Over the open sea can be seen frigatebirds and tropicbirds.

Economy and human activity

The Caribbean region has seen a significant increase in human activity since the colonization period.

Human activity in the area also accounts for a significant amount of pollution. The Pan American Health Organization estimated in 1993 that only about 10% of the sewage from the Central American and Caribbean Island countries is properly treated before being released into the sea.

The Caribbean region supports a large tourism industry. The Caribbean Tourism Organization calculates that about 12 million people a year visit the area, including (in 1991–1992) about 8 million cruise ship tourists. Tourism based upon scuba diving and snorkeling on coral reefs of many Caribbean islands makes a major contribution to their economies.

Gallery

See also

 American Mediterranean Sea
 Greater Antilles
 Hispanic America
 Ibero-America
 Intra-Americas Sea
 Kick 'em Jenny
 Latin America
 Lesser Antilles
 List of Caribbean Countries
 List of Caribbean countries by population
 Piracy in the Caribbean
 Territorial evolution of the Caribbean
 West Indies

References

Further reading

 Snyderman, Marty (1996), Guide to Marine Life: Caribbean-Bahamas-Florida, Aqua Quest Publications, pp. 13–14, 19. 
 Glover K., Linda (2004), Defying Ocean's End: An Agenda For Action, Island Press, p. 9. 
 Peters, Philip Dickenson (2003), Caribbean WOW 2.0, Islandguru Media, p. 100^^75;4. 
 Reefs at Risk in the Caribbean: Economic Valuation Methodology, World Resources Institute 2007.

External links
 Center For Advanced Study on Puerto Rico and the Caribbean

 
Geography of the Caribbean
Geography of Central America
Geography of Colombia
Geography of Mexico
Geography of Venezuela
Seas of the Atlantic Ocean
Tropical Atlantic